John Dunbrack Ewing, Sr. (February 13, 1892 – May 18, 1952), was a Louisiana journalist who served as editor and publisher of both the Shreveport Times and the Monroe News-Star-World (since the Monroe News-Star) from 1931 until his death. He was also affiliated with radio station KWKH in Shreveport, the seat of Caddo Parish in northwestern Louisiana. KWKH was founded in 1922 and named in 1925 for its founder, W. K. Henderson.

In 1927, Ewing and former Shreveport mayor and businessman Andrew Querbes co-chaired a committee of prominent Shreveport citizens that began correspondence with the United States Department of War in Washington D. C. to sell Shreveport as the sight for a planned Army airfield that would serve as an expansion of the Third Attack Group, then located in Galveston, Texas. The group originally proposed land adjacent to Cross Lake but this location was deemed unsuitable by the War Department. Instead, approval was given for unincorporated land located in nearby Bossier Parish, which the City of Shreveport annexed through a municipal bond and donated to the federal government for construction of the facility, now known as Barksdale Air Force Base.

References
"John Dunbrack Ewing", A Dictionary of Louisiana Biography, Vol. 1 (1988), p. 292
 Kathryn Hill, "Captain John D. Ewing: Civic Leader/Journalist," North Louisiana History, Vol. 32, No. 4 (Fall 2001), pp. 3–10
"John D. Ewing Dies: Publisher in the South", New York Times, May 18, 1952, p. 92
Margaret Martin, "Colonel Robert Ewing: Louisiana Journalist and Politician", (Master's thesis, 1964, Louisiana State University at Baton Rouge)
http://politicalgraveyard.com/bio/ewing.html
Time (magazine)
https://web.archive.org/web/20110726005201/http://dunbrack.org/data/ps05/ps05_345.html

Specific

American male journalists
Journalists from Louisiana
1892 births
1952 deaths
American military personnel of World War I
American newspaper executives
Ewing family (publishing)
Editors of Louisiana newspapers
Louisiana Democrats
Writers from Shreveport, Louisiana
Writers from New Orleans
Virginia Military Institute alumni
20th-century American journalists